Holy Cross Hospital may refer to:

Canada
 Holy Cross Hospital, Calgary, Alberta

United Kingdom
 Holy Cross Hospital, Haslemere, Surrey, England

United States
Holy Cross Hospital, Nogales, Arizona
Holy Cross Hospital (Fort Lauderdale), Florida
Holy Cross Hospital (Chicago), Illinois
Holy Cross Hospital (Silver Spring), Maryland
Holy Cross Hospital, Taos, New Mexico
Holy Cross Hospital (Salt Lake City, Utah), now Salt Lake Regional Medical Center

See also
Providence Holy Cross Medical Center, Burbank, California